Bsames  is a Syrian village located in Ihsim Nahiyah in Ariha District, Idlib.  According to the Syria Central Bureau of Statistics (CBS), Bsames had a population of 3,638 in the 2004 census.

References 

Populated places in Ariha District